Ernée is a commune in the Mayenne department in north-western France.

It is named after the river Ernée, which runs through the town and is situated about halfway between the towns of Laval and Fougères.  Ernée is home to a purpose-built motocross track, which has been used in the Motocross World Championships and Motocross des Nations.

Neighboring communes
The commune is bordered by the communes of Montenay, Saint-Pierre-des-Landes, Vautorte, La Pellerine, Saint-Hilaire-du-Maine, Saint-Denis-de-Gastines.

Population

International relations

Ernée is twinned with:

  Glenfield, England
  Dorsten, Germany

See also
Communes of the Mayenne department

References

Communes of Mayenne
Maine (province)